House and Garden Western Suburbs, Melbourne is a 1988 painting by Australian artist Howard Arkley. The diptych depicts a house typical of those in suburban Melbourne, reflecting Arkley's interest in Australian suburbia. The source was a real estate advertisement showing a house in Deer Park, an outer western suburb of Melbourne.

The painting is part of the collection of the National Gallery of Australia in Canberra, purchased directly from the artist in 1988.

Further reading

References

1988 paintings
Australian paintings
Collections of the National Gallery of Australia